The Son of the House is a family saga novel written by the Nigerian author Cheluchi Onyemelukwe. Her debut novel, it was first published by Penguin Random House South Africa and by Parrésia Publishers in Nigeria in 2019.

Plot
The Son of the House is focused mainly on Nwabulu, who was sent out by her step mother to work as a servant. She falls in love with a boy from a wealthy family who impregnates her and then denies the pregnancy. Nwabulu is sent back to the village where she was married to a man whose grandmother is eager to get a grandson.

Meanwhile, there is also an independent teacher named Julie who has fallen in love with a wealthy man married man named Eugene who wants nothing more than a son. 

When both women are kidnapped they tell each other their stories and find that they have more in common than they once thought.

Theme
The novel revolves around polygamy, patriarchy in Africa, and the subordinate position which most women are kept in Africa.

Reception
A reviewer at Publishers Weekly described the novel as an "...intimate study of the issues facing contemporary Nigeria resonates..." and that "...her masterly storytelling makes this consistently entertaining." Quill and Quire described it as a "...roller coaster of emotions that Nwabulu experiences with perfectly executed cliffhangers to her chapters." CBC Books acknowledged that the "...debut is set against four decades of vibrant Nigeria, celebrating the resilience of women as they navigate and transform what still remains a man's world." The novel has been compared to Buchi Emecheta's The Joys of Motherhood.

Awards and recognition
 Won the 2020 SprinNG Women Authors Prize.
 Winner for the 2021 Nigeria Prize for Literature.
 Winner of the 2019 Sharjah International Book Fair.
 35 Canadian books to check out in summer 2021 by CBC Radio.
 The Top Nigerian Books Of 2019 by Channels Television.
 Shortlisted for the 2021 Giller Prize.

References

2019 Nigerian novels
2019 Canadian novels
Family saga novels